Pterostylis ovata, commonly known as the Gawler Range rustyhood, is a plant in the orchid family Orchidaceae and is endemic to South Australia. Both flowering and non-flowering plants have a rosette of leaves and flowering plants have up to six flowers which have transparent flanges on the petals and a striped, insect-like labellum.

Description
Pterostylis ovata is a terrestrial,  perennial, deciduous, herb with an underground tuber and a rosette of between three and seven leaves. Flowering plants have a rosette at the base of the flowering stem but the leaves are usually withered by flowering time. The "body" end has between sixteen and twenty short hairs on the sides. Flowering occurs from September to October.

Taxonomy and naming
Pterostylis ovata was first formally described in 1986 by Mark Clements from a specimen grown in the Australian National Botanic Gardens from material collected near Lake Acraman. The description was published in the fourth edition of Flora of South Australia. The specific epithet (ovata) is a Latin word meaning "egg-shaped".

Distribution and habitat
The Gawler Range rustyhood grows in open situations on granite and quartzite outcrops in the Gairdner-Torrens and Eyre Peninsula botanic regions of South Australia.

References

ovata
Endemic orchids of Australia
Orchids of South Australia
Plants described in 1986